Špigelski Breg is an uninhabited settlement in the Jastrebarsko administrative area of Zagreb County, Croatia with a mere population of 91.

References

Ghost towns in Croatia